William Lucas Distant (12 November 1845 Rotherhithe – 4 February 1922 Wanstead) was an English entomologist.

Biography

Early years
Distant was born in Rotherhithe, the son of whaling captain Alexander Distant and his wife, Sarah Ann Distant (née Berry).

Following his father's death in 1867, a trip to the Malay Peninsula to visit his older brother, also named Alexander and a ship's captain, aroused his interest in natural history, and resulted in the publication of Rhopalocera Malayana (1882–1886), a description of the butterflies of the Malay Peninsula. (He considered 5 August 1867 as the most eventful day in his life).

Career 
Much of Distant's early life was spent working in a London tannery, and while employed there he made two long visits to the Transvaal. The first resulted in the publication of A Naturalist in the Transvaal (1892). The second visit, of some four years, gave him time to amass a large collection of insects, of which many were described in Insecta Transvaaliensia (1900–1911). In 1890 he married Edith Blanche de Rubain. In 1897 he succeeded James Edmund Harting as editor of The Zoologist. From 1899 to 1920 he was employed by the Natural History Museum, describing many new species found in their collection, and devoting most of his time to the Rhynchota (true bugs).

His other works included Volume I of the Heteroptera and part of Volume I of the Homoptera of the Biologia Centrali-Americana (1880–1900), and the Hemiptera volumes of The Fauna of British India, Including Ceylon and Burma (1902–1918).

Later life 
Distant's collection of 50,000 specimens was purchased by the Natural History Museum in 1920. He died of cancer at Wanstead.

Legacy
Distant is commemorated in the scientific names of: Distantiella, a genus of mirid bugs and a species of snake, Leptotyphlops distanti.

Publications
A partial list of works is as follows.
 1902-1918: The Fauna of British India, Including Ceylon and Burma. (Rhynchota volumes 1–7)
 1900-1911: Insecta Transvaaliensia: A Contribution to the Entomology of South Africa.
 A Naturalist in the Transvaal
 A Monograph of Oriental Cicadidae
 Rhopalocera Malayana: A Description of the Butterflies of the Malay Peninsula
Hemiptera
Biologia Centrali-Americana: Insecta Rhynchota Hemiptera-Heteroptera
Biologia Centrali-Americana
Rhynchotal Motes: Membracidae
"Rhynchota from New Caledonia and the Surrounding Islands" in Fritz Sarasin and Jean Roux's Nova Caledonia: Forschungen in NeuCalodonien und auf den Loyalty-Inslen – Recherches scientifiques en Nouvelle Calédonie et aux Iles Loyalty
A Synonymic Catalogue of Homoptera
 1912: Homoptera : fam. Cicadidae : subfam. Cicadinae.
Scientific Results of the Second Yarkand Mission: Based Upon the Collections and Notes of the Late Ferdinand Stoliczka: Rhynchota

References

External links

NDSU biographical information. Archived link. Archived 14 July 2006. Retrieved 10 December 2017.

Biologia Centrali-Americana – Insecta, Hemiptera, Heteroptera-Homoptera

English entomologists
English taxonomists
1845 births
1922 deaths
Hemipterists
Employees of the Natural History Museum, London
People from Southwark
19th-century British zoologists
20th-century British zoologists
People from Rotherhithe